Douglas A. Crossman (born June 13, 1960) is a Canadian former professional ice hockey defenceman who played 14 seasons in the National Hockey League (NHL). Crossman was born in Peterborough, Ontario, and grew up in London, Ontario.

Playing career
Drafted in the sixth round of the 1979 NHL Entry Draft from the Ottawa 67's, Crossman played 914 NHL games for the Chicago Black Hawks, Philadelphia Flyers, Los Angeles Kings, New York Islanders, Hartford Whalers, Detroit Red Wings, Tampa Bay Lightning and St. Louis Blues. He had been also traded to the Quebec Nordiques on June 15, 1992 by the Red Wings with Dennis Vial for cash and then was selected by the Lightning on June 18 in the expansion draft, so he never played a game with the Nordiques. He retired in 1996.

He was a member of the 1987 Canada Cup Canadian National team.

Career statistics

Regular season and playoffs

International

External links
 

1960 births
Living people
Baltimore Bandits players
Canadian ice hockey defencemen
Chicago Blackhawks draft picks
Chicago Blackhawks players
Chicago Wolves (IHL) players
Denver Grizzlies players
Detroit Red Wings players
Hartford Whalers players
Ice hockey people from Ontario
London Knights players
Los Angeles Kings players
New Brunswick Hawks players
New Haven Nighthawks players
New York Islanders players
Ottawa 67's players
Peoria Rivermen (IHL) players
Philadelphia Flyers players
St. Louis Blues players
Sportspeople from London, Ontario
Sportspeople from Peterborough, Ontario
Tampa Bay Lightning players